This is a list of broadcast television stations that are licensed in the Commonwealth of Puerto Rico.

Full-Service stations
VC refers to the station's PSIP virtual channel while RF refers to the station's physical RF channel.

Defunct full-service stations
Channel 14: WPSJ - Ponce (1970s)
Channel 14: WMEI - Arecibo (2007-2017)
Channel 16: WMGZ - Mayagüez (1970s)
Channel 16: WTRA - Mayagüez (1986-1999?)
Channel 18: WTSJ - San Juan (10/1/1964-1970s)
Channel 30: WITA-TV - San Juan (late 1960s)
Channel 31: WSJU-TV - San Juan (1984-2018)
Channel 34: WFNN - Fajardo
Channel 36: WOTE  - Bayamón
Channel 42: WUIA-TV - San Germán
Channel 46: WCNT - Cidra
Channel 62: WFEC - San Juan

LPTV stations

Defunct/Inactive LPTV stations
Channel 8: W08AB (CDM Internacional) - Guayama
Channel 14: W14BM - Rio Piedras
Channel 17 (RF channel 17): W17CZ-D - San Juan
Channel 17 (RF channel 17): W17DK-D (TV RED) - Salinas
Channel 19 (RF channel 19): W19DK-D (TV RED) - Cataño
Channel 20: WPRU-LP - (ABC) - Aguadilla
Channel 22: W22AB - (Telemundo) - Mayagüez
Channel 24: WSJX-LP - (LATV) - Aguadilla
Channel 26 (RF channel 26): W26DO-D - (PBS) - Mayagüez
Channel 28 (RF channel 28): W28DV-D - (TV RED) - Rincón
Channel 30 (RF channel 30): W30CQ-D - Ponce
Channel 31 (RF channel 31): W31DE-D - Mayagüez
Channel 32: W32AA - (Telemundo) - Aguadilla
Channel 33: W33BE - (Religious) - Arecibo
Channel 36 (RF channel 31): W31DL-D - (Newsmax TV/Rev'n/SonLife/Retro TV) - Ponce
Channel 38: W38AB - (Ponce Television Corporation) - San Sebastián
Channel 39 (RF channel 39): W39DE-D - (Liberty Junior College TV) - Cayey
Channel 40 (RF channel 40): W40DA-D - (TV RED) - Quebradillas
Channel 41 (RF channel 42): W42DZ-D - (TV RED) - Adjuntas
Channel 42: W42AA - (Telemundo) - Yauco
Channel 43: W43AA - (WAPA) - Utuado
Channel 43: W43AW - (Signal Broadcasting) - San Juan
Channel 44 (RF channel 44): W44CV-D - (TV RED) - Utuado
Channel 45 (RF channel 45): W45DI-D - (TV RED) - Juana Diaz
Channel 45 (RF channel 46): W46EO-D - (TV RED) - Culebra
Channel 46 (RF channel 46): W46ES-D - (TV RED) - Ponce
Channel 46: W46AZ - San Juan
Channel 47 (RF channel 47): W47DU-D - (TV RED) - Ciales
Channel 47 (RF channel 47): W47DX-D - (TV RED) - Canovanas
Channel 47 (RF channel 48): W48DT-D - (TV RED) - Guayanilla
Channel 49: W49AC - (WAPA) - Adjuntas
Channel 50: W50AV - San Germán
Channel 50 (RF channel 50): W50EC-D - (TV RED) - Cayey
Channel 56: W56AA - (WAPA) - Orocovis
Channel 56: W56BC - (Canal 13) - Fajardo
Channel 58: W58AA - (Ponce Television Corporation) -Caguas
Channel 59: W59BQ - Ponce
Channel 60: W60AA (Western Broadcasting Corporation) - San Germán
Channel 60: W60AW (Canal 13) - Arecibo 
Channel 65: W65BQ - Mayagüez
Channel 65: W65CJ - Guayama
Channel 66: W66AY - Mayagüez
Channel 67: W67BN - Mayagüez
Channel 69: W69BR - Mayagüez
Channel 72: W72AO - Maricao
Channel 82: W82AM - Maricao
Channel 83: W83AO - Jayuya

Translators

Stations leased for Construction Permit

 Channel 10 (RF channel 10): W10CZ-D - San Juan
 Channel 31 (RF channel 31): W31DK-D - Mayagüez
 Channel 36 (RF channel 36): W36DU-D - Mayagüez
 Channel 38 (RF channel 38): W38EN-D - San Juan
 Channel 51 (RF channel 51): W51EH-D - Ponce

See also

 List of Spanish-language television networks in the United States
 Media of Puerto Rico

Bibliography
  
 

 
Television stations
Puerto Rico